Sar Jowshar-e Edalat (also Romanized as Sar Jowshar-e ‘Edālat; also known as Sar Jowshīr) is a village in Tashan-e Sharqi Rural District, Tashan District, Behbahan County, Khuzestan Province, Iran. Sina Edalat; At the 2006 census, its population was 371, in 82 families.

References 

Populated places in Behbahan County